Lippenhuizen is a village in the municipality of Opsterland in the east of Friesland, the Netherlands. It had a population of around 1,330 in January 2017.

History 
The village was first mentioned in 1315 as Luppingahusum, and means houses of the Luppinga family. Lippenhuizen developed on a sandy ridge in a heath and moorland region. In 1718, the Opsterlandse Compagnonsvaart was extended to near the church for the excavation of peat. The Dutch Reformed church dates from 1743. In 1860, a tower was added to the church.

Lippenhuizen was home to 1,002 people in 1840.

Notable people
  (1833–1893), author of children's and young adult literature
  (1897–1974), novelist
  (1914–1944), painter
 Foppe de Haan (born 1943), football coach

Gallery

References

External links

Populated places in Friesland
Geography of Opsterland